Fatty acid 2-hydroxylase is a protein that in humans is encoded by the FA2H gene.

Function 

This gene encodes a protein that catalyzes the synthesis of 2-hydroxysphingolipids, a subset of sphingolipids that contain 2-hydroxy fatty acids. Sphingolipids play roles in many cellular processes and their structural diversity arises from modification of the hydrophobic ceramide moiety, such as by 2-hydroxylation of the N-acyl chain, and the existence of many different head groups.

Clinical significance 

Mutations in this gene have been associated with leukodystrophy dysmyelinating with hereditary spastic paraplegia type 35 (SPG35) with or without dystonia as well as fatty acid hydroxylase-associated neurodegeneration. The largest cohort with a detailed phenotypical description and a highly sensitive imaging phenotype ('WHAT'- acronym for: white matter changes, hypointensity of the globus pallidus, ponto-cerebellar atrophy, and thin corpus callosum) was recently published.

FA2H has been shown to modulate cell differentiation in vitro. FA2H is may be a Δ9-THC-regulated gene, as Δ9-THC induces differentiation signal(s) in poorly differentiated MDA-MB-231 cells.

References

Further reading